The Fort Atkinson Formation is a geologic formation in Wisconsin. It preserves fossils dating back to the Ordovician period.

See also

 List of fossiliferous stratigraphic units in Wisconsin
 Paleontology in Wisconsin

References
 

Ordovician geology of Wisconsin
Ordovician southern paleotropical deposits